Bob Lamson may refer to:

Bob Lamson, inventor of Lamson L-106 Alcor
Bob Lamson, a character in two episodes of The Walking Dead (season 5)